"When Joanna Loved Me" is a 1964 song. The words were written by Jack Segal and the music by Robert Wells. The song was popularised by Tony Bennett, although other versions have been recorded by artists such as Frank Sinatra, Paul Desmond and, on his first solo album, Scott Walker.

References

External links
 Jack Segal obituary

1964 songs
Tony Bennett songs
Frank Sinatra songs
Scott Walker (singer) songs
Songs written by Jack Segal
Songs written by Robert Wells (songwriter)